Whigstreet is a village in the county of Angus, Scotland, between the towns of Forfar and Carnoustie. Nearby lie the remains of a temporary Roman marching camp dating to the third century AD.

References

Villages in Angus, Scotland